Mausam is a 2011 Indian Hindi-language romantic drama film written and directed by Pankaj Kapur under the Vistaar Religare Film Fund banner. The film stars Shahid Kapoor opposite Sonam Kapoor. The film was originally scheduled to release on 16 September 2011, but due to the delay in obtaining the NOC from the Indian Air Force, it was pushed back further by a week, releasing on 23 September 2011. The film declared flop at the box office but the song "Rabba Main Toh Mar Gaya" was appreciated and received critical acclaim.

Plot
The main story of the film spans over a period 10 years, from 1992 to 2002 and includes references to Demolition of Babri Masjid, Bombay riots, 1993 Bombay bombings, Kargil War, 9/11 attacks and Post-Godhra Riots.

Mausam is the story of two lovers, Harinder Singh, known as Harry and Aayat. Harry is a happy-go-lucky Punjabi guy, whereas Aayat is a Kashmiri girl.

In 1992 Aayat and her Bua (Aunt) Fatima escape from Kashmir due to Insurgency. Aayat's mother is murdered by the militants, thus forcing her father Ghulam Rasool (Kamal Chopra) and her Chacha Maharaj Kishan to send her along with her aunt to Mallukot.

In Mallukot, Aayat meets a young happy-go-lucky boy named Harinder 'Harry' Singh. Harry is the son of a College Professor. He and his friends are popular locals who spend their days goofing around. A Mallukot girl named Rajjo however nurses a deep crush on Harry, but he constantly rejects her. But when Harry meets Aayat for the first time he is instantly smitten and falls in love with her. Aayat initially is hesitant but later reciprocates his love. They both grow close during the preparations of Pammo's (Harry's elder sister) wedding. Pammo marries Mahinder Pal 'MP' Singh, Harry's friend from London. However, after hearing the news of the Demolition of the Babri Masjid the following day, Aayat and her family flee to Mumbai. Aayat does not inform Harry before leaving, making him heartbroken. Meanwhile, Harry gets selected in the Indian Air Force, and he also leaves Mallukot for NDA.

In 1999, Harry and Aayat again meet in Edinburgh. Aayat has been staying there for the past seven years, after losing her relative in the 1993 Bombay bombings, and Harry now a Squadron Leader has been sent there by the Indian Air Force on a special assignment. In London, they again grow closer, prompting Aayat's family to fix her marriage with Harry. Aayat later invites Harry over to her place.

On the day of the visit, however, the Kargil War breaks out, and Harry is immediately recalled to India. On arrival, Harry is posted with a Mirage 2000 Squadron in Jodhpur. Meanwhile, Aayat's father passes away, forcing her entire family to relocate from London back to Mallukot. Aayat and Harry both try to contact each other but fail.

Harry is later deployed to the Adampur Air Base (Gwalior Air Base in reality), where he is attached with No. 7 Squadron "Battleaxes". Aayat goes to Ahmedabad and from there returns to London.

In order to dislodge the enemy from Tiger Hill, Indian Air Force resorts to heavy aerial bombardment. Harry is selected to lead a special bombing mission over Tiger Hill. The mission is successful but Harry's aircraft malfunctions, causing him to crash-land. Harry's left arm becomes semi-paralyzed, requiring two months to recover.

Aayat, meanwhile, has left London. She stays with Akram, a family friend's son, in New York, while her aunt has returned to Ahmedabad. Two months later, while Harry is in Switzerland for the birth of his nephew, he is convinced by Pammo not to let go of Aayat. He goes in search of her and realizes that she is in New York. However while travelling in a train in Switzerland, Harry spots Aayat with Akram and his son. Mistakenly believing that Aayat is married, he begins to feel that all hope is lost, and decides to completely forget her.

Terrorists bomb New York WTC Towers on 11 September 2001. As a result of these attacks there is a sudden surge in hate crimes against Muslims in USA and Europe, prompting Akram and Aayat to return to Ahmedabad. Coincidentally, Harry is also in Ahmedabad for his friend's wedding. Aayat decides to forget Harry and marry Akram. However, in 2002 when the wedding is about to take place, Ahmedabad is engulfed in riots. Aayat runs for her safety and is saved by Harry, who is also hiding. Harry and Aayat wait until the rioters leave, but they are accidentally spotted and attacked. Harry and Aayat run into a blazing fire, where they rescue a horse and a baby girl. Aayat laments their fate, but Harry convinces her to forget the past and see the brighter future.

In the epilogue it is revealed that, Harry and Aayat get married, they adopt the baby girl, and they themselves are expecting a child.

Cast
 Shahid Kapoor as Squadron Leader Harinder "Harry" Singh
 Sonam Kapoor as Aayat Rasool/Aayat Harinder Singh
 Anupam Kher as Maharaj Kishan 
 Supriya Pathak as Fatima
 Shayan Munshi as Yasin
 Kamal Chopra as Ghulam Rasool, Ayaat's father
 Maya Mankotia as Pamela Singh (Pammo), Harry's sister
 Kamal Tiwari as Prof. Sadprakash Singh (Bauji), Harry's father
 Herry Tangri as Katar Mahindar Pral Singh (MP), Pammo's fiancé, then husband
 Aditi Sharma as Rajjo
 Surjit Singh Dhami as Darji
 Arvinder Singh Bhatti as Dr. Balvinder Singh
 Manoj Pahwa as Gulzari
 Jass Bhatia as Kartar
 Maninder Velli as Deepa
 Amandeep Singh as Jeeta
 Vaibhav Talwar as Akram
 Lorna Anderson as Maria
 Ankit Mohan as Flt Lt Ashfaq Hussain
 Rahul Vohra as Flt Lt T.N. Ayyar
 Wamiqa Gabbi as Lala Durgadas's daughter

Production 

In early August 2010, Nawman Malik claimed that the title Mausam is registered under his name and filed a complaint with the Association of Motion Pictures and TV Programme Producers. He was also claiming that the story of Mausam is his. Now, Mallik has moved the Mumbai High Court asking for an injunction against producer Sheetal Talwar and director Pankaj Kapur for using the title. He has demanded a compensation of Rs 10 million for the title and has submitted a digital film called Mausam, which he claims he made.

The film was shot primarily in Edinburgh and India while the Air Force scenes were shot at the Gwalior Air Force Base. The shooting took two years to complete, part of the delay caused by Sonam Kapoor's illness during the shoot.

In September, the film was denied submission for censorship because the Air Force had objected to a 30-second long aerial action sequence with Shahid Kapoor who plays an Air Force pilot in Mausam. Special permission had been sought and granted to shoot in a real airbase. The Air Force were objecting to a dramatic action fight sequence with Shahid on board a Mirage fighter plane. Mausam producer Sheetal Talwar announced: "We had the script cleared by the Air Force on August 23, 2010. Now suddenly they're objecting to a sequence after it's been shot, edited and the film was ready for censoring?"

Release

Critical reception 
Zee News bureau gave the film 4 stars saying "‘Mausam’ can be best described as a wonderful blend of offbeat and mainstream cinema which is full of charm, elegance and vivacity." Bollycurry gave the film 4 stars out of 5 praising Pankaj Kapur's direction and saying "In his directorial debut, he tells an old-fashioned story of love, separation and reunion with flourishes and flashes of great cinema igniting what would in lesser hands, appear to be a trite tale of love gone frightfully clichéd." Nikhat Kazmi of Times Of India rated it three out of five saying "The film tries to strike a balance between art and mainstream cinema and succeeds partially." Saibal Chatterjee of NDTV gave it 3 stars out of 5. Taran Adarsh of Bollywood Hungama gave the film 4 stars out of 5, saying that, "On the whole, Mausam is a slow movie!" but praises the Shahid Kapoor's performance saying "Shahid gives his all to this role, submitting himself to his director-father to mould him the way he chooses to. It won't be erroneous to state that Shahid surpasses all his previous performances, including the one in Kaminey, with this film. The film also marks the coming of age of this actor."Rajeev Masand of CNN-IBN, was also not kind to Mausam. He rated it 2 out of 5, saying, "Director Pankaj Kapur infuses his story and his characters with a delicate, old-fashioned charm that is pleasing and quaint at first, but gets progressively exhausting when logic goes out of the window"

Box office
The film made with the budget of 380 million, opened good at the box office but collections fell on after a week at release of force and the film grossed Rs. 316 million in India. It collected  gross in its first week and ended its lifetime collections with  gross worldwide. The film was declared a flop at box office.

Soundtrack

The music of the film was composed by Pritam, while the lyrics were penned by Irshad Kamil.
There are two other songs which were seen in the movie, but were not released. One of them is sung by Sonu Nigam and Shreya Ghoshal and is a romantic track by Pritam "Zara Si Mehndi"; the other is sung by Shreya Ghoshal, a romantic track "Abhi Na Jao Chhod Kar", adapted from the 1961 Hindi film Hum Dono.

Track listing

Reception
Joginder Tuteja from Bollywood Hungama gave it 4 out of 5 stars and said: "Mausam is a fantastic album and has all the ingredients that make for a popular soundtrack. While 'Sajh Dhaj Ke' and 'Mallo Malli' are the pick of the lot when it comes to instant chartbusters in the making, 'Rabba Main Toh Mar Gaya Oye' and 'Ik Tu Hi Tu Hi' are good enough to enjoy a rather extended shelf life. Just pick this one up!"

Accolades

References

External links
 
 
 Mausam film page and review from Toronto International Film Festival (TIFF)

2011 films
2010s Hindi-language films
Indian war drama films
Indian aviation films
Films shot in Edinburgh
Films set in Jammu and Kashmir
Films featuring songs by Pritam
2011 war drama films
Indian Air Force in films
Films set in Kargil
Kashmir conflict in films
2011 directorial debut films
2011 drama films
Films based on Indo-Pakistani wars and conflicts
Films based on the September 11 attacks
Ayodhya dispute
1993 Bombay bombings
2002 Gujarat riots
Military of Pakistan in films